Utsiyev is a Chechen surname. Notable people with the surname include:

 Rizvan Utsiyev (born 1988), Russian footballer

Russian-language surnames